Michael J. Clouse (sometimes credited as Michael J. Clouse III), an American record producer and songwriter was born in Boston, Massachusetts.  

He graduated from Framingham North High School in Framingham, Massachusetts and received a degree from the American College of Greece while playing basketball in Europe. 

This afforded Clouse the opportunity while traveling, to be exposed to many different styles of music.

Upon returning to the States in the mid-1980s, Clouse began his music career in Los Angeles, working with the likes of the late Jeff Buckley, David Morgan (The Association, Three Dog Night), Marco Mendoza (Ted Nugent, Thin Lizzy, The Dead Daisies), Nicky Hopkins (The Rolling Stones, The Beatles, The Who), Shawn Lee (musician) (Monkeyboy), Jamie Carter (Jon Butcher (band)), Carl Young (Michael Franti & Spearhead (band)), Blues Traveler, and seminal LA band The Coma-Tones, to name a few. 

In the early 1990s, Clouse started working in film and television as a music supervisor and songwriter.

In the mid-1990s, Clouse relocated to NYC and opened a recording studio on W.26th St., where he continued his work with the late Jeff Buckley, and numerous young artists, as well as continuing his work in film.

In the late 1990s – early 2000s, Clouse was enlisted by the Jeff Buckley Estate to be involved in many of Buckley's posthumous releases beginning with Sketches for My Sweetheart the Drunk, collaborating with the late Chris Cornell, Buckley's mother, Mary Guibert and various band members of Jeff's band.

In addition to continuing to produce artists, Clouse has written numerous songs for film and television. 

Michael Clouse presently resides in Nashville, TN, with his wife, Terri.

Selected albums
(as Producer, Engineer, Mix Engineer, and/or Songwriter)

Documentaries 
(appeared in as Michael J. Clouse III)
Goodbye and Hello (2000) from Netherlands TV
Fall in Light (1999) from French TV

References
Apter, Jeff. A Pure Drop: The Life of Jeff Buckley Omnibus Press 2009  
David Bret, "Trailblazers: The Tragic Lives of Gram Parsons, Nick Drake and Jeff Buckley" - JR Books Ltd 2009  
Browne, David. Dream Brother: The Lives and Music of Jeff and Tim Buckley. Harper Entertainment. 2001, 2002. 
Lovell, Joel.  GQ Magazine  (July 2000) "Smells Like Team Spirit"
Hail Caesar (1994 film)

Songwriters from Massachusetts
Songwriters from Ohio
Living people
People from New Albany, Ohio
People from Framingham, Massachusetts
Businesspeople from Boston
Year of birth missing (living people)
Framingham High School alumni